Khademul Islam is a Bangladesh Awami League politician and the former Member of Parliament of Thakurgaon-1.

Career
Islam was elected to parliament from Thakurgaon-1 as a Bangladesh Awami League candidate in 1991 and 12 june 1996.

References

Awami League politicians
Living people
5th Jatiya Sangsad members
Year of birth missing (living people)
7th Jatiya Sangsad members